Špačince is a village and municipality of Trnava District in the Trnava region of Slovakia.

References

External links

http://spacince.sk  
http://en.e-obce.sk/obec/spacince/spacince.html

Villages and municipalities in Trnava District